Characiopsis is a genus of yellow-green algae in the family Characiopsidaceae.

References

 The genus Characiopsis Borzi (Mischococcales, Tribophyceae). Haydée Pizarro, Taxonomy, biogeography and ecology, 1995. 113 pages, 4 figures, 11 plates on 33 p. as app., (Bibliotheca Phycologica, Band 98)

External links
 
 Characiopsis at AlgaeBase
 Characiopsis at the World Register of Marine Species

Heterokont genera
Xanthophyceae